The NBC College Football Game of the Week refers to nationally televised broadcasts of Saturday afternoon college football games that were produced by NBC Sports, the sports division of the NBC television network in the United States. Bowl games were always exempt from the NCAA's television regulations, and the games' organizers were free to sign rights deals with any network. In NBC's case, the 1952 Rose Bowl at the end of that particular season was the first national telecast of a college bowl game.

Background
NBC first televised college football on September 30, 1939. NBC broadcast the game between Waynesburg and Fordham on station W2XBS (which would eventually become NBC's flagship station, WNBC) with one camera and Bill Stern was the sole announcer. Estimates are that the broadcast reached approximately 1,000 television sets. Twelve years later, the first live regular season college football game to be broadcast coast-to-coast aired on NBC. The game in question, was Duke at the University of Pittsburgh on September 29, 1951.

Pretty soon on June 6, 1952, NBC Head of Sport Tom Gallery led negotiations towards a one-year football contract (for $1,144,000) with the NCAA. The contract incidentally came about after the 1951 NCAA convention voted 161-7 to outlaw televised games except for those licensed by the NCAA staff. The deal allowed NBC to select one game a week to broadcast on Saturday afternoons, with the assurance that no other NCAA college football broadcast would appear on a competitive network. In the first college football game to be broadcast under this new NCAA television contract, on September 20, Kansas defeated TCU 13–0.

By 1953, the NCAA allowed NBC to add what it called "panorama" coverage of multiple regional broadcasts for certain weeks – shifting national viewers to the most interesting game during its telecast. After NBC lost its college football contract following the 1953 season, they carried Canadian football in 1954. NBC regained college football rights in 1955 and aired games through the 1959 season.  NBC regained the NCAA contract for the 1964 and 1965 seasons

Even after losing the rights to regular season college football in both 1959 and 1965, NBC continued to carry postseason football. NBC carried the Blue–Gray Football Classic, an all-star game, on Christmas Day, until dropping the game in 1963 as a protest of the game's policy of segregation. It consistently served as the Rose Bowl's television home until 1988 and added the Sugar Bowl from 1958 to 1969 (which replaced the network's coverage of the Cotton Bowl Classic).

Commentators

Play-by-play
Mel Allen (1952–1957)
Lee Giroux (1956)
Chick Hearn (1957, 1965)
Lindsey Nelson (1953, 1955-1959, 1964–65)
Jim Simpson (1957)

Color commentary

Frankie Albert (1965; with Chick Hearn)
Terry Brennan  (1964–65; with Lindsey Nelson)
Leo Durocher (1956; with Lee Giroux on west coast regional games)
Bill Flemming (1957; with Mel Allen)
Lee Giroux (1957; with Chick Hearn)
Red Grange (1955–1959; with Lindsey Nelson)
Charley Harville (1957; with Jim Simpson on southeast games)
Bill Henry (1952)
Bill Munday (1953; with Lindsey Nelson)
Lindsey Nelson (1953; with Mel Allen)
Bill Voights (1956; with Mel Allen on midwest regional games)
Bud Wilkinson  (1964–65; with Lindsey Nelson)

Schedules

1952
Mel Allen and Bill Henry served as the primary broadcast crew.

1953  
Mel Allen and Lindsey Nelson served as the primary broadcast crew.

1955
Lindsey Nelson and Red Grange served as the primary broadcast crew.

1956
Lindsey Nelson and Red Grange served as the primary broadcast crew.

1957
Lindsey Nelson and Red Grange served as the primary broadcast crew. On October 12 and 26 and November 9, 23 and 28, NBC showed regional games with Mel Allen/Bill Flemming (midwest), Jim Simpson/Charley Harville (southeast), and Chick Hearn/Lee Giroux (west).

1958

1959

See also
College football on television
Notre Dame Football on NBC
College Football on NBCSN
NBC college bowl game broadcasts

References

College football television series
College Football Game of the Week
College Football Game of the Week
1952 American television series debuts
1959 American television series endings
1964 American television series debuts
1965 American television series endings